is a railway station on the Nippō Main Line operated by Kyūshū Railway Company in Usa, Ōita, Japan.

Lines

Layout 
The station, which is unstaffed, consists of an island platform serving two tracks. The station building is a wooden structure of simple, functional design which serves only to house a waiting area and an automatic ticket vending machine. Access to the island platform is by means of a footbridge.

Adjacent stations

History
Japanese National Railways (JNR) opened the station on 1 October 1956 as an additional station on the existing track of the Nippō Main Line. With the privatization of JNR on 1 April 1987, the station came under the control of JR Kyushu.

Passenger statistics
In fiscal 2015, there were a total of 32,796 boarding passengers, giving a daily average of 90 passengers.

See also
List of railway stations in Japan

References

External links

  

Railway stations in Ōita Prefecture
Railway stations in Japan opened in 1956